Russell Street is a main street and thoroughfare in the central business district of Melbourne, Victoria, Australia. It runs roughly north-south and was laid out as a core feature of the Hoddle Grid in 1837.

Russell Street is named after John Russell, British Home Secretary and leader of the House of Commons in Lord Melbourne's cabinet. Russell himself was also a future Prime Minister of the United Kingdom.

Geography 
Russell Street runs roughly north-south and is located one block east of the city's central thoroughfare of Swanston Street.

At its southern end, the street intersects with Flinders Street and Federation Square, while at its northern end it becomes Lygon Street, the main street of Melbourne's Little Italy.

Notable buildings 
Russell Street is lined with established trees and is the home of numerous public amenities and buildings. Noteworthy structures include: 
 QV Village
 RMIT University
 Grand Hyatt Hotel
The street is also home to many buildings featured on the Victorian Heritage Register or classified by the National Trust of Australia, including:
 Old Melbourne Gaol (1845)
 Duke of Wellington Hotel (1850)
 State Library of Victoria (1854)
 Scots' Church (1874)
 Eight Hour Day Monument, commemorating Melbourne's labor movement to adopt the 8 hour working day (1903)
 City Watch House (1909)
 Former Melbourne Magistrates' Court (1914)
 Emily McPherson College of Domestic Economy (1927)
 Former Russell Street Police Headquarters (1943)
 Former Russell Street Telephone Exchange & Post Office (1954)
 Total House (1965)
 Several Underground Public conveniences

Russell Street Bombing 

On 27 March 1986, a car bomb was detonated on Russell Street near the Police Headquarters. Constable Angela Taylor died and 21 others were injured in what was described as a ‘revenge attack' on Melbourne police, perpetrated by Stanley Taylor and Craig Minogue.

Transport 
Russell street is partly serviced by Kinetic Melbourne bus routes 200 and 207. 

Whilst the street does not have tram lines or train stations located on it, it is easily reached by public transport via Parliament, Flinders Street and Melbourne Central stations. It also intersects with several streets which are serviced by Melbourne tramlines, including Victoria Street, La Trobe Street, Bourke Street, Collins Street and Flinders Street.

See also

References

Streets in Melbourne City Centre